Jason Ballard is an American politician and attorney who is a member of the Virginia House of Delegates for the 12th district. Elected in November 2021, he assumed office on January 12, 2022.

Education 
Ballard earned a Bachelor of Arts degree from Concord University, a Juris Doctor from the West Virginia University College of Law, and a Master of Laws from The Judge Advocate General's Legal Center and School.

Career 
Ballard served in the United States Army for 12 years, including as a lawyer for the United States Army Judge Advocate General's Corps. Since retiring from the military, he has worked as an attorney and partner at Headley Ballard LLC. He is also a member of the Pearisburg Town Council. He was elected to the Virginia House of Delegates in November 2021, defeating Democratic incumbent Chris Hurst.

Electoral history

References 

Living people
Concord University alumni
West Virginia University College of Law alumni
The Judge Advocate General's Legal Center and School alumni
Virginia lawyers
Virginia Republicans
People from Pearisburg, Virginia
Year of birth missing (living people)
United States Army Judge Advocate General's Corps